Shaun Dooley (born 29 March 1974) is an English actor, narrator and voice-over artist.

Early life 
Dooley was born in Barnsley in Yorkshire. He studied at the Arden School of Theatre in Manchester between 1992 and 1995.

Career 
Dooley's first acting role was as Shaun in Groove on a Stanley Knife in 1997. He later played Ritchie Fitzgerald in Coronation Street from 1997 until 1998. He appeared occasionally in EastEnders as Tom Stuart between 2001 and 2004 until he was replaced during his filming of The Street. He had a role in P.O.W..

Dooley played Peter Harper in BBC drama series The Street. He also featured in the 2007 television docudrama Diana: Last Days of a Princess. Dooley portrayed Kieran in the British horror film Salvage. He portrayed police inspector Dick Alderman in all three parts of the Red Riding trilogy and in 2017 appeared as Reverend Michaelmas Winter in the Sky 1 drama Jamestown.

In 2019, Shaun and his wife Polly produced an album, Got It Covered, for Children in Need. The album featured Helena Bonham Carter, Jim Broadbent, Olivia Colman, Luke Evans, Suranne Jones, Adrian Lester, Himesh Patel, David Tennant, Jodie Whittaker and Shaun himself singing unique cover versions of songs personal to them. The album was released on 1 November 2019. The album and accompanying documentary was co-produced by their company 20four7films, BBC Studios and SilvaScreen Records.

Personal life 
Dooley has been married to his wife Polly since 1998 and the couple have four children. Shaun is the older brother of Kimberly Dooley, and Stephanie Ann Dooley, who is known professionally as Stephanie Dooley-Day and is an actress.
 
He is a lifelong supporter of Barnsley F.C.

Filmography

References

External links

1974 births
Living people
20th-century English male actors
21st-century English male actors
Actors from Barnsley
English male soap opera actors
English male voice actors
Male actors from Yorkshire
English expatriates in Canada